Irving George Hubbs (November 18, 1870 – July 22, 1952) was an American lawyer and politician.

Biography
He was born on November 18, 1870 in Sandy Creek, Oswego County, New York to George L. Hubbs and Catharine Snyder.

He graduated from Pulaski Academy in 1887, and from Cornell University Law School. He was admitted to the bar in 1891, and practiced law in Pulaski, New York until 1911 when he was elected a justice of the New York Supreme Court (5th District). From 1918 on, he sat on the Appellate Division, Fourth Dept. and was Presiding Justice from 1923 on.

In 1928, he was elected on the Republican ticket to the New York Court of Appeals. On November 30, 1939, he tendered his resignation from the bench to take effect on December 31, 1939.

He died on July 22, 1952 at his home in Pulaski, New York. He was buried in Pulaski Village Cemetery.

References

External links
The History of the New York Court of Appeals, 1932-2003 by Bernard S. Meyer, Burton C. Agata & Seth H. Agata (pages 19f)
 Court of Appeals judges
JUDGE HUBBS QUITS COURT OF APPEALS in NYT on December 1, 1939 (subscription required)
 Presiding justices of the Fourth Dept., page 7, with portrait

Judges of the New York Court of Appeals
1870 births
1952 deaths
Cornell Law School alumni
People from Sandy Creek, New York
People from Pulaski, New York